"Nada Valgo Sin Tu Amor" (English: "I'm Worthless Without Your Love") is a song by Colombian singer-songwriter Juanes from his album Mi Sangre.  At the 2005 Latin Grammy Awards, the song won Best Rock Song and the inaugural Lo Nuestro Award for Rock/Alternative Song of the Year.

Track listing
 "Nada Valgo Sin Tu Amor" – 3:16 (Juanes)

Chart performance

References

2004 singles
Juanes songs
Songs written by Juanes
Latin Grammy Award for Best Rock Song
Number-one singles in Spain
Song recordings produced by Gustavo Santaolalla
Spanish-language songs
Universal Music Latino singles
2004 songs